Pilocarpine is a medication used to reduce pressure inside the eye and treat dry mouth. As an eye drop it is used to manage angle closure glaucoma until surgery can be performed, ocular hypertension, primary open angle glaucoma, and to bring about constriction of the pupil following its dilation. However, due to its side effects it is no longer typically used for long-term management. Onset of effects with the drops is typically within an hour and lasts for up to a day. By mouth it is used for dry mouth as a result of Sjögren syndrome or radiation therapy.

Common side effects of the eye drops include irritation of the eye, increased tearing, headache, and blurry vision. Other side effects include allergic reactions and retinal detachment. Use is generally not recommended during pregnancy. Pilocarpine is in the miotics family of medication. It works by activating cholinergic receptors of the muscarinic type which cause the trabecular meshwork to open and the aqueous humor to drain from the eye.

Pilocarpine was isolated in 1874 by Hardy and Gerrard and has been used to treat glaucoma for more than 100 years. It is on the World Health Organization's List of Essential Medicines. It was originally made from the South American plant Pilocarpus.

Medical uses 
Pilocarpine stimulates the secretion of large amounts of saliva and sweat. It is used to prevent or treat dry mouth, particularly in Sjögren syndrome, but also as a side effect of radiation therapy for head and neck cancer.

It may be used to help differentiate Adie syndrome from other causes of unequal pupil size.

It may be used to treat a form of dry eye called aqueous deficient dry eye (ADDE)

Surgery
Pilocarpine is sometimes used immediately before certain types of corneal grafts and cataract surgery. It is also used prior to YAG laser iridotomy. In ophthalmology, pilocarpine is also used to reduce symptomatic glare at night from lights when the patient has undergone implantation of phakic intraocular lenses; the use of pilocarpine would reduce the size of the pupils, partially relieving these symptoms. The most common concentration for this use is pilocarpine 1%. Pilocarpine is shown to be just as effective as apraclonidine in preventing intraocular pressure spikes after laser trabeculoplasty.

Presbyopia 
In 2021, the US Food and Drug Administration approved pilocarpine hydrochloride as an eyedrop treatment for presbyopia, age-related difficulty with near-in vision. It works by causing the pupils to constrict, increasing depth of field, similar to the effect of pinhole glasses. Marketed as Vuity, the effect lasts for more than 6 hours.

Other
Pilocarpine is used to stimulate sweat glands in a sweat test to measure the concentration of chloride and sodium that is excreted in sweat. It is used to diagnose cystic fibrosis.

Adverse effects 
Use of pilocarpine may result in a range of adverse effects, most of them related to its non-selective action as a muscarinic receptor agonist. Pilocarpine has been known to cause excessive salivation, sweating, bronchial mucus secretion, bronchospasm, bradycardia, vasodilation, and diarrhea. Eye drops can result in brow ache and chronic use in miosis. It can also cause temporary blurred vision or darkness of vision, temporary shortsightedness, hyphema and retinal detachment.

Pharmacology
Pilocarpine is a drug that acts as a muscarinic receptor agonist. It acts on a subtype of muscarinic receptor (M3) found on the iris sphincter muscle, causing the muscle to contract - resulting in pupil constriction (miosis). Pilocarpine also acts on the ciliary muscle and causes it to contract. When the ciliary muscle contracts, it opens the trabecular meshwork through increased tension on the scleral spur. This action facilitates the rate that aqueous humor leaves the eye to decrease intraocular pressure. Paradoxically, when pilocarpine induces this ciliary muscle contraction (known as an accommodative spasm) it causes the eye's lens to thicken and move forward within the eye. This movement causes the iris (which is located immediately in front of the lens) to also move forward, narrowing the Anterior chamber angle. Narrowing of the anterior chamber angle increases the risk of increased intraocular pressure.

Society and culture

Preparation 
Plants in the genus Pilocarpus are the only known sources of pilocarpine, and commercial production is derived entirely from the leaves of Pilocarpus microphyllus (Maranham Jaborandi). This genus grows only in South America, and Pilocarpus microphyllus is native to several states in northern Brazil.

Pilocarpine is extracted from the powdered leaf material in a multi-step process. First the material is treated with ethanol acidified with hydrochloric acid, and the solvents removed under reduced pressure. The resultant aqueous residue is neutralized with ammonia and put aside until the resin has completely settled. It is then filtered and concentrated by sugar solution to a small volume, made alkaline with ammonia, and finally extracted with chloroform. The solvent is removed under reduced pressure.

Trade names 

Pilocarpine is available under several trade names such as: Diocarpine (Dioptic), Isopto Carpine (Alcon), Miocarpine (CIBA Vision), Ocusert Pilo-20 and -40 (Alza), Pilopine HS (Alcon), Salagen (MGI Pharma), Scheinpharm Pilocarpine (Schein Pharmaceutical), Timpilo (Merck Frosst), and Vuity (AbbVie).

Research 

Pilocarpine is used to induce chronic epilepsy in rodents, commonly rats, as a means to study the disorder's physiology and to examine different treatments. Smaller doses may be used to induce salivation in order to collect samples of saliva, for instance, to obtain information about IgA antibodies.

Veterinary 

Pilocarpine is given in moderate doses (about 2 mg) to induce emesis in cats that have ingested foreign plants, foods, or drugs. One feline trial determined it was effective, even though the usual choice of emetic is xylazine.

References

External links 

 

Ophthalmology drugs
Imidazoles
Tetrahydrofurans
Novartis brands
Pfizer brands
Gamma-lactones
Muscarinic agonists
Alkaloids found in Rutaceae
World Health Organization essential medicines
Wikipedia medicine articles ready to translate